Gariné Torossian  is a Canadian filmmaker. Her works include Stone, Time, Touch which won best documentary at the Warsaw International Film Festival in 2007. Her films have screened at MoMa, the Telluride Film Festival (Colorado), Lux Cinema (London), the Egyptian Theatre (Los Angeles), the Jerusalem Film Festival, the Warsaw International Film Festival, Berlinale, and a host of cinematheques, including those in Berlin, Edmonton, Ottawa, Winnipeg and Vancouver. Torossian's debut short, Visions (1992), was part of a retrospective at Centre Pompidou when she was 22. Her subsequent shorts were screened at New York Museum of Modern Art Cineprobe series when she was 25, and at the Spielberg theatre at the Egyptian (2019). Torossian's work has been broadcast on Arte France, Documentary Channel (Canada), Bravo Canada, Sundance Channel (USA), SBS (Australia) and WTN (Canada). Her films focus on notions of memory, longing and identity, underlined by her diverse and comprehensive filmography.

Awards
Girl from Moush (1994) was awarded best short at the Melbourne International Film Festival. Torossian was commissioned by the American indie rock band Sparklehorse to produce a music video. The resulting short film, SPARKLEHORSE (1999), received commendation at the 2000 Berlinale, the Berlin International Film Festival. Her short film featuring the music of Sparklehorse, BABIES ON THE SUN (2001), received the Panorama short film prize at the Berlinale, the Berlin International Film Festival. HOKEES won a gold prize for drama at the Houston Film Festival (2000) and best short at the Los Angeles AFFMA Film Festival (2000). Torossian's Stone Time Touch (2007) is a feature-length documentary filmed mostly in Armenia. It was awarded best documentary feature at the Warsaw International Film Festival (2007). She was awarded a DAAD (Berliner Künstlerprogramm) filmmaker fellowship in Berlin in 2007. In 2019, Girl from Moush was selected to be part of the Panorama 40, for the 40th anniversary of the birth of the Panorama at the Berlinale.

Critical reviews

"The Yerevan brilliantly indexed in An Inventory of Some Strictly Visible Things bears little resemblance to the hallucinatory Armenia of Girl From Moush. An Inventory’s (2017) crisply shot and starkly lit digital renderings belong to the here and now rather than there and then... I watched a retrospective of Torossian’s work hosted by the Los Angeles Filmforum at the Egyptian Theatre in July. It was the first retrospective program of her films in Los Angeles — a staggering fact given her monumental contributions to feminist diasporic cinema over the past quarter-century." From Hyperallergic, Mashinka Firunts (2019) 

"In a nod to Perec, Torossian’s An Inventory of Some Strictly Visible Things is a riveting account of the everyday in a small post-Soviet republic: a country obsessed with the catastrophic... It is a powerful celebration of the extraordinary in the ordinary; an essential respite from the white noise of the White House, and the tyranny of the headline." —Bomb (2017)

"In a national culture seemingly obsessed with identity, the careening, intense, arresting works of Gariné Torossian are poetic cinematic searches for and expressions of those very elusive notions of belonging and identification that make her an idiosyncratic yet quintessentially Canadian artist.  Formally freewheeling and merging the visual languages of Super 8, 35mm, and video, her body of work is one of the most startling and original to have emerged in Canada over the last decade and a half."—Tom McSorley, Executive Director, Canadian Film Institute (2010).

"Torossian put together a stunning piece that comments on and extends Atom Egoyan's film's structure and themes. The resulting six-minute meditation on a homeland she has yet to visit, Girl from Moush, transforms the iconic architectural stills into a river of images."—from Image and Territory, Adam Gilders, edited by Monique Schofen (2006)

"In 2002, she won the Panorama short film prize at the Berlinale for "Babies on the Sun" (2001), five impressive minutes in which Torossian nostalgically traces memories of childhood." —Berliner Kunstlerprogramm (2007)

"Torossian, a filmmaker whose work was featured at MoMA during a one-woman Cineprobe program in 1995, created a personal and somewhat autobiographical work for her first feature STONE TIME TOUCH. In search of her identity, she visits Armenia, the land of her forebears, and makes a vivid and impressionistic diary of beauty, wonderment, and sadness."—Laurence Kardish, Senior Curator at MoMa, Department of Film

"One of Canada's most original filmmakers."—Liam Lacey, Globe & Mail

Filmography

 1992 – VISIONS (4min, 16mm, Color) Director, Editor, Cinematographer
 1993 – PLATFORM (8min, 16mm, Color) Director, Editor, Cinematographer
 1994 – GIRL FROM MOUSH (5min, 16mm, Color) Director, Editor, Cinematographer
 1995 – DROWNING IN FLAMES (25min, 16mm, Color) Director, Editor, Cinematographer
 1996 – MY OWN OBSESSION (30min, 16mm, Color) Director, Editor, Cinematographer
 1997 – PASSION CRUCIFIED (22min. 16mm, Color) Director, Editor
 1998 – POMEGRANATE TREE (3 min, 16 mm, Color) Director, Editor, Cinematographer
 1999 – RED BRICK (5 min, Video) Director, Cinematographer
 1999 – SPARKLEHORSE (9 min, 16mm, Color) Director, Editor, Cinematographer
 2000 – DUST (6 min, Video) Director, Editor, Cinematographer
 2000 – DEATH TO EVERYONE (6 min, 16 mm, Color) Director, Editor, Cinematographer
 2000 – HOKEES (25 min, 16mm, Color) Director
 2001 – BABIES ON THE SUN (5min, 16 mm) Director, Editor, Cinematographer
 2002 – SHADOWY ENCOUNTERS (15 min, 16 mm) Director, Editor, Cinematographer
 2003 – GARDEN IN KHORKHOM (14 min, Video) Director, Editor, Cinematographer
 2004 – SANDIAS EUSTASY (10min) Director, Producer, Editor
 2005 – HYPNOTIZE / MEZMERIZE (11 min, Video, System of a Down rock band), Director
 2007 – ELECT THE DEAD (3min, Color, Music Video) Director, Editor, Cinematographer
 2007 – STONE, TIME, TOUCH (74 min, Color) Director, Editor, Cinematographer
 2008 – COME AROUND (5 min, Video) Director, Editor, Cinematographer
 2017 – LA STRUCTURE EST POURRIE, CAMARADE (9 min, Color, Video) Director, Editor
 2017 – AN INVENTORY OF SOME STRICTLY VISIBLE THINGS (4 min, Color, Video) Director

External links
https://hyperallergic.com/514292/garine-torossian-girl-from-moush/ "Review in Hyperallergic" 2019
https://bombmagazine.org/articles/looking-back-2017-art/ "Review in Bomb magazine" 2017
http://www.cfi-icf.ca/index.php?option=com_content&task=view&id=43&Itemid=32 "Canadian Film Institute Retrospective" 2010
http://www.cfi-icf.ca/index.php?option=com_cfi&task=showevent&id=51 "Elective Identities: the Arresting Images of Garine Torossian" 2010
http://mikehoolboom.com/?p=132 "Interview with Mike Hoolboom" 1997
https://www.youtube.com/watch?v=PX1qZ6seZUQ "Elect the Dead, music video for System of a Down lead singer, directed by Torossian 2007
http://www.berliner-kuenstlerprogramm.de/en/gast.php?id=1064 "Berliner Kunstlerprogramm biography" 2007

References

Canadian women film directors
Canadian people of Armenian descent
Canadian documentary film directors
Lebanese emigrants to Canada
Lebanese people of Armenian descent
Living people
Film directors from Toronto
Year of birth missing (living people)
Canadian women documentary filmmakers